The Raby Hunt is a two Michelin star
 restaurant located in Summerhouse, County Durham, United Kingdom. Whilst it is housed in a 200 year old Grade II listed building, the restaurant itself was opened in 2009 as chef James Close's first. It gained its first star in 2012 and its second in 2016, making it (as of January 2019) the only establishment in North East England to reach that status. As it offers overnight accommodation it is classed as a Restaurant with Rooms, the modern equivalent of an inn. 

In 2018 it was reported that local residents were objecting to  diners and delivery vans blocking the bus stop and side roads, and making parking in the area difficult", and complaints were made about owners and staff treating the village "with contempt". Durham Constabulary had been called out repeatedly to the site, but said that on nearly all occasions no parking offences had been committed. They called on the restaurant to defuse the situation.

References

External links
Official website
Entry on The Good Food Guide website

Michelin Guide starred restaurants in the United Kingdom
Restaurants in England
Restaurants established in 2009
Grade II listed buildings in County Durham
2009 establishments in England